Elections to North Yorkshire County Council took place on 4 June 2009, having been delayed from 7 May, in order to coincide with elections to the European Parliament.

Results

|}

Divisional results

Craven district

Hambleton district

Harrogate district

Richmondshire district

Ryedale district

Scarborough district

Selby district

Notes

References

2009 English local elections
2009
2000s in North Yorkshire